Transtillaspis zenenaltana is a species of moth of the family Tortricidae. It is found in Loja Province, Ecuador.

The wingspan is about 16 mm.  The ground colour of the forewings is cream, sprinkled and strigulated (fine streaks) with brown. The hindwings are cream, but whiter basally and slightly tinged with brownish in the apical part. The strigulation is brownish grey.

Etymology
The species name refers to Zenen Alto, the type locality.

References

Moths described in 2008
Transtillaspis
Taxa named by Józef Razowski